The 2003–04 NBA season was the Bulls' 38th season in the National Basketball Association. During the offseason, the Bulls re-signed free agent and former Superstar forward Scottie Pippen. However, they continued to struggle finishing last place in the Central Division with a 23–59 record, missing the playoffs for the sixth straight season. Following the season, Pippen retired and Jamal Crawford was traded to the New York Knicks. (See 2003–04 Chicago Bulls season#Regular season)

Offseason
 July 20, 2003: Signed F Scottie Pippen
 August 20, 2003: Signed G Kendall Gill
 September 4, 2003: Bought out contract of C Dalibor Bagaric
 October 23, 2003: Waived G Trenton Hassell

NBA Draft

Roster

Roster Notes
 Point guard Jay Williams missed the entire season due to a dislocated left knee from a motorcycle accident.

Regular season

Heading in to the season, Bulls fans were as optimistic as they had been in years. Before it was done, however, winds of change had blown through the Windy City leaving a roster and a coaching staff upside down.

After closing out the previous season with four solid wins in the final six games to reach the 30–victory plateau, the team was hopeful of reaching the playoffs for the first time since 1998 and new pieces were added to the team’s puzzle for that to happen.

First, Kirk Hinrich was taken with the seventh overall pick in the 2003 NBA Draft to fill the void at the guard spot. This happened just days after the team learned it would be without services of Jay Williams, who was injured in a motorcycle accident in June and would miss this entire season.

Later in the summer, the Bulls brought back one of the sport’s all-time legends when free agent Scottie Pippen—a seven-time NBA All-Star, two-time Olympic gold medalist and one of the 50 greatest players in NBA history—returned to Chicago on 07/20/03.

“I think I know how to win games in the NBA. It may sound simple, but both winning and losing can become a mindset, and I won’t accept losing—ever. Whether it’s on the floor, in the huddle, at practice or just demonstrating a winning leadership, I plan on helping this team win,” said Pippen.

Just one month into the season, however, it became clear that expectations were not being met and changes were necessary. With a 4–10 record, the team relieved Bill Cartwright of his head coaching duties (11/24/03). A few days later, Scott Skiles was named head coach (11/28/03) as he set out to instill a tough, defensive-minded, and high-effort mentality upon his new team.

The Bulls makeover wasn’t done yet. A blockbuster of a deal went down on 12/01/03, when Chicago traded Lonny Baxter, Donyell Marshall and Jalen Rose to Toronto for Antonio Davis, Chris Jefferies and Jerome Williams.

“This trade helps us address a couple of different areas, areas that we needed to get stronger in. It not only provides us with size, but also with energy,” said John Paxson.

While the Bulls continued to struggle, improvements in effort under Coach Skiles were evident, and the roster re-make had only begun. The team’s 23–59 record qualified it for a sixth consecutive NBA Draft Lottery appearance.

Other Notes: Hired Assistant Coaches Johnny Bach (07/15/03) and Ron Adams (07/16/03) … snapped a 26-game road losing streak versus Western Conference teams with a 95–79 win at Utah (02/04/04) … Hinrich dished out 506 assists and his average of 6.7 apg ranked tied for 7th in the NBA, despite the Bulls ranking last in the league in team field goal percentage (.414) … Hinrich was the only rookie in the NBA to tally a triple–double when he registered 11 points, 12 rebounds and 10 assists against the visiting Golden State Warriors (02/28/04) … Jamal Crawford went for a career–high 50 points (18–34 FG, 8–11 FT) at Toronto (04/11).

Honors: Kirk Hinrich (freshman team) participated in the Schick Rookie Challenge at All-Star Weekend … Hinrich also was named to the got milk? NBA All-Rookie First Team … the Bulls drew an average of 19,736 fans through 41 home games (third in the NBA), including 11 sellouts … the Bulls also hosted the seven largest crowds in the NBA, including a season-high draw of 23,067 versus the L.A. Lakers at the United Center.

Standings

Record vs. opponents

Player statistics

Season

Awards and records
 Kirk Hinrich, NBA All-Rookie Team 1st Team

See also
 2003–04 NBA season

References

Chicago Bulls seasons
Chicago
Chicago
Chicago